El Manaqil (also known as El Managil, Al Manaqil and Al Mahagil) is district of Al Jazirah state, Sudan. The capital is also called El Manaqil. The population is 906,216. It is one 7 districts in Al Jazirah.

References
 http://www.statoids.com/ysd.html
 https://commons.wikimedia.org/wiki/File:Sudan_district_map_Al_Managil.svg  
 Districts of Sudan 

Districts of Sudan